Vandikkari is a 1974 Indian Malayalam-language film, directed and produced by P. Subramaniam. The film stars Thikkurissy Sukumaran Nair, Muthukulam Raghavan Pillai, Adoor Pankajam and S. P. Pillai. The film has musical score by G. Devarajan.

Cast
Thikkurissy Sukumaran Nair
Muthukulam Raghavan Pillai
Adoor Pankajam
S. P. Pillai
Vijayasree

Soundtrack
The music was composed by G. Devarajan and the lyrics were written by Sreekumaran Thampi.

References

External links
 

1974 films
1970s Malayalam-language films
Films directed by P. Subramaniam